13th Airborne Division may refer to:

 13th Airborne Division (United States), an airborne formation in the United States Army during World War II
 13th Guards Airborne Division, a division of Soviet Airborne Troops which was part of the 37th Guards Airborne Corps